Bill Williams may refer to:

Entertainment
 Bill Williams (actor) (1915–1992), American film actor
 Bill Williams (game designer) (1960–1998), designer and programmer of Atari 8-bit family and Amiga computer games

Sports
 Bill Williams (1900s footballer), English football player
 Bill Williams (Australian footballer) (1925–2016), Australian rules footballer for South Melbourne
 Bill Williams (footballer, born 1904) (1904–1993), Australian rules footballer for Fitzroy
 Bill Williams (footballer, born 1929) (1929–2009), Australian rules footballer for Richmond and Stawell Gift winner
 Bill Williams (footballer, born 1942), English football player
 Bill Williams (footballer, born 1960), English football player

Other
 Bill Williams (priest) (1914–1990), H. C. N. Williams, an Anglican priest and author
 Bill Williams (journalist) (born 1934)
 Bill Williams (trader) (born 1932)
 Bill K. Williams (1943–2019), American politician
 Old Bill Williams (1787–1849), American mountain man and trader
 William Emrys Williams (1896–1977), known as Bill, editor-in-chief of Penguin Books, 1936–1965
 Edgar Williams (1912–1995), known as Bill, British Army officer and Oxford academic at Rhodes House
 Bill Williams River, a river in the western half of the U.S state of Arizona draining into the Colorado River

See also
 Billy Williams (disambiguation)
 William Williams (disambiguation)

Williams, Bill